Kim Clijsters and Janette Husárová were the defending champions, but none competed this year. Clijsters decided to focus on the singles tournament, which she ended winning.

Maria Sharapova and Tamarine Tanasugarn won the title by defeating Elena Tatarkova and Marlene Weingärtner 6–1, 6–4 in the final.

Seeds

Draw

Draw

References

External links
 Official results archive (ITF)
 Official results archive (WTA)

2003 Doubles
SEAT Open - Doubles
2003 in Luxembourgian tennis